Augusteae is a tribe of flowering plants in the family Rubiaceae and contains 89 species in 3 genera. Augusta is found from Mexico to Brazil and in the southwestern Pacific region, Wendlandia is found in northeastern tropical Africa, tropical and subtropical Asia and Queensland, and Guihaiothamnus is found in South China.

Genera 
Currently accepted names

 Augusta Pohl (4 sp)
 Guihaiothamnus H.S.Lo (1 sp)
 Wendlandia Bartl. ex DC. (84 sp)

Synonyms

Augustea DC. = Augusta
Bonifacia Silva Manso ex Steud. = Augusta
Katoutheka Adans. = Wendlandia
Lindenia Benth. = Augusta
Schreibersia Pohl = Augusta
Sestinia Boiss. & Hohen. = Wendlandia
Siphonia Benth. = Augusta

References 

Ixoroideae tribes